Megistacantha is a genus of worms belonging to the family Rhadinorhynchidae.

Species:

Megistacantha horridum 
Megistacantha sanghaensis

References

Acanthocephalans